Caroline Poussier (born 13 July 1976) is an Andorran alpine skier. She competed in two events at the 1994 Winter Olympics.

References

External links
 

1976 births
Living people
Andorran female alpine skiers
Olympic alpine skiers of Andorra
Alpine skiers at the 1994 Winter Olympics
Place of birth missing (living people)